Baixo Alentejo may refer to:
 Baixo Alentejo Province (1936-1976)
 Baixo Alentejo (intermunicipal community) (NUTS 3 region)

See also
 Alto Alentejo (disambiguation)
 Alentejo